The Guaju River is a river in Northeastern Brazil. It forms part of the border between the Paraíba and Rio Grande do Norte states.

See also
List of rivers of Paraíba
List of rivers of Rio Grande do Norte

References

Rivers of Paraíba
Rivers of Rio Grande do Norte